Alexandra Monika Neldel (born 11 February 1976) is a German actress from Berlin.

Career 
Neldel worked as a dental assistant before she was discovered by the boss of a Berlin casting agency during a polo competition. He helped her audition for daily soap opera Gute Zeiten, schlechte Zeiten and Neldel, barely experienced in acting, immediately landed the role of Katja Wettstein. After leaving GZSZ in 1999 Neldel starred in several German motion pictures and TV films, including Lammbock, Samba in Mettmann and Emmy-winning Berlin, Berlin.

In 2005 Neldel made her breakthrough as Lisa Plenske, the leading role in the Sat.1 telenovela Verliebt in Berlin. She decided to leave the series after the final episode of season one.

Filmography

Cinema 
 1999: Bang Boom Bang
 2000: 
 2000: 
 2001: Lammbock
 2003: Der letzte Lude
 2003: 
 2004: Samba in Mettmann
 2004: 
 2005: Barefoot
 2006: Goldene Zeiten
 2007: Messy Christmas
 2008: 
 2012: The Treasure Knights and the Secret of Melusina
 2012: Unter Frauen

TV films 
 1998: Die Mädchenfalle – Der Tod kommt online
 1998: Das Miststück
 1999: Doggy Dog – Eine total verrückte Hundeentführung
 2000: Heimliche Küsse – Verliebt in ein Sex-Symbol
 2001: Verliebte Jungs
 2001: Die Großstadt-Sheriffs
 2002: Rosamunde Pilcher: Wenn nur noch Liebe zählt
 2004:  – 
 2005: Scharf wie Chili
 2005: Comedy-Schiff (sketch comedy)
 2006: Die ProSieben Märchenstunde – Der Froschkönig
 2007: Zodiak – Der Horoskop-Mörder (4-part miniseries)
 2009:  (3-part miniseries)
 2009: Killerjagd. Töte mich, wenn du kannst
 2010: Killerjagd. Schrei, wenn du dich traust
 2010: The Whore
 2010: Glückstreffer – Anne und der Boxer
 2011: Bollywood lässt Alpen glühen
 2011: Buschpiloten küsst man nicht
 2012: The Revenge of the Whore
 2012: 
 2013:

Series 
 1996–1999: Gute Zeiten, schlechte Zeiten
 2000–2001: OP ruft Dr. Bruckner (5 episodes)
 2002: Ein Fall für zwei (episode 198)
 2003: SOKO 5113 (episode 293)
 2004–2005: Berlin, Berlin (3. – 4. season)
 2005–2007: Verliebt in Berlin
 2008: Unschuldig

Dubbing 
 2000: Titan A.E.
 2001: Dr. Dolittle 2
 2006: Open Season
 2010: Tangled

Awards 
 1997: Bravo Otto in Silver in the category TV-Star female
 1998: Bravo Otto in Silver in the category TV-Star female
 2005: Undine Award – Best Young Supporting Actress in a film for Barefoot
 2005: Maxim – Woman of the Year
 2005: German Television Award – Best daily series as a member of the crew of Verliebt in Berlin
 2005: Bravo Otto in Silver in the category TV-Star female
 2006: Rose d'Or – Best European Soap as a member of the crew of Verliebt in Berlin
 2006: Rose d'Or – Beste Soap-Actress for Verliebt in Berlin
 2006: Berliner Bär (BZ-Kulturpreis) in the category TV
 2008: Bavarian TV award – Best Actress in the series category for Unschuldig
 2011: Nomination for the German Television Award in the category Best Actress for The Whore

External links 

 
 

1976 births
German film actresses
Actresses from Berlin
Living people
German soap opera actresses
German television actresses
21st-century German actresses